Ilenia Draisci (born 13 July 1989) is an Italian sprinter.

Biography
Ilenia Draisci participated at one edition of the European Indoor Championships (2013), she has 3 caps in national team from 2012.

Achievements

National titles
She has won six times the individual national championship.
1 win in 100 metres (2011)

See also
 Italy national relay team
 Italian all-time lists – 4 × 100 metres relay
 Italy at the 2013 Mediterranean Games

References

External links
 

1989 births
Athletes from Rome
Athletics competitors of Gruppo Sportivo Esercito
Italian female sprinters
Living people
Mediterranean Games gold medalists for Italy
Athletes (track and field) at the 2013 Mediterranean Games
World Athletics Championships athletes for Italy
Mediterranean Games medalists in athletics